Hometime is an American PBS home improvement television program. It aired from November 1, 1986, to January 30, 2016.  Hometime was broadcast on public television and in syndication.

Hometime was produced by Hometime Video Publishing of Chaska, Minnesota, in association with WHYY-TV—Wilmington/Philadelphia.

Hometime demonstrates both do-it-yourself- and contractor-performed projects, ranging from simple weekend projects to complete homes. Hometime episodes have covered many aspects of home construction and maintenance.

Hosts
Although Dean Johnson has continuously hosted Hometime since its inception, there have been five co-hosts and one tri-co-host:

 Peggy Knapp co-hosted Hometime from 1986 to 1987.
 JoAnne "JoJo" Liebeler co-hosted the program from 1987 to 1992. She later hosted and produced her own shows: Room for Change (1995–2002) on HGTV, Home Savvy (1996–2001) on TLC, and Passport to Design (2002–2005) on Travel Channel. Liebeler is now the president of her own production company (2×4 Productions) and returned as a guest on Hometime for projects in October 2006, December 2009, September 2010 and a sunroom project in November 2013.
 Susanne Egli co-hosted the program from 1992 to 1993.
 Robin Hartl co-hosted Hometime from 1993 to 2005. She has appeared in infomercials for the Little Giant Ladder with actor Richard Karn and the Worx GT lawn trimmer and edger. Hartl now works in the Twin Cities at the Anoka Design Studio as an American Society of Interior Designers (ASID) designer who helps builders and their clients choose designs and finish materials for new house, room addition, and similar construction projects.
 Miriam Johnson co-hosted Hometime from 2005 until the end of the series in 2016. She hosted through her pregnancy with daughter Sula Catherine. Johnson and her husband, Paul, finished an extensive renovation of their 80-year-old home. Miriam is now a real estate agent with Coldwell Banker Burnet in the Twin Cities.

References

External links
 
 
 
 

1986 American television series debuts
2016 American television series endings
1980s American television series
1990s American television series
2000s American television series
2010s American television series
Home renovation television series
PBS original programming